Indus Motor Company Limited, operating as Toyota Indus, is a Pakistani automobile manufacturer which is a subsidiary of Japanese multinational automaker Toyota Motor Corporation. It is based in Karachi, Pakistan.

Founded in 1989, as a joint venture between House of Habib, Toyota Tsusho and Toyota Motors.

Indus Motor is the authorized assembler and manufacturer of Toyota and Daihatsu vehicles, auto parts and accessories in Pakistan since 1 July 1990 at its  manufacturing plant at Port Bin Qasim Industrial Zone, outside Karachi.

Indus Motor has employed 3,349 persons.

History
Indus Motor was incorporated as a public limited company in December 1989 and started commercial production in March 1993. Shares of the company are quoted on the Pakistan Stock Exchange.

In March 2000, the company started production of Daihatsu Cuore in Pakistan which was based on the domestic Mira and features an 850-cc engine.

In January 2012, the company halted Cuore production in Pakistan.

Former Chairman of Indus Motor Company Ltd, Ali Suleman Habib died on 18 April 2020.

Products

Cars
 Toyota Yaris
 Toyota Corolla
 Toyota Camry
 Toyota Prius

Offroaders
 Toyota Rush
 Toyota Hilux
 Toyota Fortuner
 Toyota Land Cruiser
 Toyota Land Cruiser Prado
 Toyota Corolla Cross

Buses & Vans 
 Toyota Hiace
 Toyota Coaster

See also 
 List of automobile manufacturers
 Toyota Motor Corporation
 Toyota Tsusho Corporation

References

External links
 Indus Motor Company Limited 
 Indus Motor on Asia's 200 Best Under A Billion 2007 (Forbes.com website)
 Toyota Global 

Car manufacturers of Pakistan
Bus manufacturers of Pakistan
Manufacturing companies based in Karachi
Vehicle manufacturing companies established in 1990
Pakistani companies established in 1990
Pakistani subsidiaries of foreign companies
Toyota
Toyota Tsusho
Companies listed on the Pakistan Stock Exchange
House of Habib